The Brampton Library is a system of public libraries in Brampton, Ontario, Canada.

In the 2003 Ontario Public Library Week (October 20 to 26), the library was rebranded with a new logo, and a change in name from the Brampton Public Library to the simpler and more direct Brampton Library had taken place.

The library currently has eight branches, with a collection of more than 562,000 books, magazines, large print materials, audio books, and DVDs. It has a staff of 160 full-time and part-time employees. Brampton Library services a population of just under 600,000 people spanning over more than 200 distinct ethnicities.

Todd Kyle is the Chief Executive Officer of the Brampton Library, a position that replaces that of Executive Director.

History
As early as 1858, a library was founded in the Mechanic's Institute, serving 50 people in what was then classified as Brampton. These 360 volumes, plus a federal grant of $160, were the starting blocks for the first actual public library in Brampton, founded in 1887 in the Golding Building on Queen Street. As printing presses were still relatively expensive to operate, and thus book prices high, the village-owned facility had full written contracts with patrons to check out books. Only the librarian and the library board were allowed to take books off the closely watched shelves.

In 1907, the library successfully received a grant from US steel magnate Andrew Carnegie to build a new library. Carnegie was a self-made millionaire with "very little formal education", and a well known drive to bring "learning to the masses". Records show donations to 1700 libraries, and the hundreds of facilities across the continent still bearing his name are living proof.

Despite being a supporter of culture in general, Carnegie was opposed to the multipurpose facility the village intended to build, as it exceeded his default start-up donation of $10,000. After a meeting with the Brampton Board of Trade's R.J. Copeland, and a promise from Brampton itself to up its funding from $1000 to $1250 a year, Carnegie provided another $12,500 for the town's long-time showpiece facility.

In 1946, the Brampton library took on a relatively novel concept for the era, in letting residents under the age of 16 sign out books from the collection.

During the 1960s and 1970s, the system expanded to fit the needs of a growing population. The expansion included the Northwood Park Branch (Flowertown and McLaughlin), South Branch (at Brampton Mall on Main Street at Nanwood), and Heart Lake Branch.  The Heart Lake branch would later become known as "Cyril Clark", after a Chinguacousy reeve.

In 1972, developer Bramalea Consolidated Developments Ltd constructed the Civic Centre facility for the town of Bramalea, the cornerstone of which was officially laid as part of the finished building during Brampton's Centennial celebrations in 1973. Along with government offices and a theatre, this facility included a large space for a central library branch. When Brampton and Bramalea merged in 1974, their library systems became one. Bramalea's Chinguacousy Branch joined Brampton's Main Branch (which had replaced the Carnegie library with a larger building next door, and which was later renamed to "Four Corners Branch" due to its location near downtown Brampton's Four Corners) and others, becoming the system's resource library. As the reference branch, Chinguacousy was host to an extensive collection of microfilm, local history materials, and genealogy resources.  In 2008 the majority of these materials were moved to the Four Corners location in the newly renovated Local History section on the second floor.

Books-by-mail services ended in 1975.

A neighbourhood branch was eventually created in a mall at Ray Lawson Blvd. and Hurontario St., and renamed the County Court Branch when it was moved to an office building nearby (later renamed again to Fletcher's Creek Branch). When the South Fletchers Sportsplex was built, Fletcher's Creek moved from private to public property, and was renamed South Fletchers Branch.

In 2011, the Brampton Library system opened the new Mount Pleasant branch in the north-west area of the city.

The Gore Meadows branch was built in the north-east of the city on Castlemore Road at The Gore Road and opened in 2013.  This location is part of a city recreation centre located in parkland that is planned to provide multiple services, similar to Chinguacousy Park.

In addition to the six regular branches, Brampton Library also operated an interim site in the north-east region of the city.  This housed a very small collection, mostly DVDs and paperbacks, as well as allowing customers a location at which to pick up and return items.  A new full-service location at Torbram and Sandlewood, one kilometre north of the former North-East Interim site, is planned to start providing services to residents in the surrounding area in 2017.  This interim site closed October 1, 2016; the lease on the site was not renewed because at the time the nearby full-service branch was expected to begin operating in the summer of 2016.

Discussions are still ongoing regarding replacing the current downtown branch with a modern facility.

In 2020, the library stopped assessing late fees on children's material returned late, and in December 2021 the library board voted to eliminate fines for any material returned late and to cancel all outstanding fines on 31 January 2022. It will still assess fines for materials not returned, for those returned in damaged condition, or for holds that are not picked up.

Branches

Previous branches

Services
Information and reference services
Access to full text databases
Community information
Internet access
Readers' advisory services
Programs for children, youth and adults

List of teen services
 Youth Leadership Program
 Teen Library Council
 Animation-Manga Club
 Toastmasters Program

See also
 Ontario Public Libraries
 Ask Ontario

References

External links

 Brampton Library

Buildings and structures in Brampton
Public libraries in Ontario
Carnegie libraries in Canada
Culture of Brampton
Education in Brampton
Library buildings completed in 1908
Tourist attractions in Brampton
1908 establishments in Ontario